Sunbury is a census-designated place (CDP) and unincorporated community in Gates County, North Carolina, United States. As of the 2010 census, it had a population of 289.

Sunbury has a post office with ZIP code 27979.

Sunbury High School was listed on the National Register of Historic Places in 2009.

Demographics

2020 census

As of the 2020 United States census, there were 276 people, 164 households, and 115 families residing in the CDP.

References

Census-designated places in North Carolina
Census-designated places in Gates County, North Carolina
Unincorporated communities in North Carolina
Unincorporated communities in Gates County, North Carolina